The 1982–83 Wisconsin Badgers men's ice hockey team represented the University of Wisconsin–Madison in college ice hockey. In its first year under head coach Jeff Sauer, the team compiled a 33–10–2 record. The Badgers won the 1983 national championship, their fourth title.

Season

Early season trouble
After finishing as the runner up the year before, head coach Bob Johnson left to become the bench boss of the Calgary Flames. He was replaced by former assistant and long-time Colorado College coach Jeff Sauer. The team was very experienced, having made the national championship game in each of the previous two seasons, but early on the squad appeared to have a rough time adjusting to their new coach's style. The team took 3 out of a possible 4 points against eventual CCHA champion Bowling Green in their season opener but the following weekend, back at home, they could only manage a split with Dalhousie. When they opened their conference schedule at the end of October the team couldn't win either contest against Minnesota, leaving the Badgers with a mediocre 2-2-2 record. The following weekend Wisconsin welcomed their coach's former team to Madison and won three games over four days to vastly improve their conference standing. UW held firm with a home split against the Golden Gophers then lost a road series at North Dakota to drop their WCHA record back to .500.

Winning Streak
Wisconsin returned closer to home in late November to face a terrible Illinois–Chicago team and needed overtime to pull out a win. After such a poor performance the team collected itself and game out firing two days later against Air Force, dominating the Falcons in one of the most lopsided series in team history (The Badgers outscored Air Force 27–1 in the two games). After the offensive outburst the Badgers relaxed a bit and were beaten at home by Minnesota–Duluth before salvaging a split in the second game. The win in Duluth was a turning point for the Badgers, who later admitted it was the first time where they really listened to their new coach. With their first win in December, Wisconsin began a stretch of 11 consecutive victories, the first seven coming at home followed by a further 4 in Colorado before CC stopped their streak. When it was over the Badgers were in the thick of the race for the WCHA title and, with 20 wins already, had a good chance at a berth in the NCAA tournament regardless of the WCHA tournament.

Stumbling down the stretch
Unfortunately, after losing to Colorado College, Wisconsin faced defending national champion North Dakota and the Fighting Sioux got the better of them again, taking 3 of 4 points and putting UND up in the conference standings by 3. After managing a split with Duluth the week after Wisconsin found themselves 5 points behind both UND and Minnesota with only 4 games remaining but when the Gophers swept the Fighting Sioux the following weekend the Badgers' two wins over Denver put them just behind North Dakota for a first round bye. Wisconsin needed to win against Minnesota and get help from Duluth, both of which happened on the last Friday of the regular season, but the Golden Gophers recovered for a split and Wisconsin watched second place slip away when North Dakota won their season finale.

WCHA tournament
With their 3rd-place finish the Badgers were forced to play in the first round of the conference tournament but fortunately they faced the 6–26–1 CC Tigers. The series was closer than may have been expected but Wisconsin won in the end and advanced to face a rested North Dakota in the Semifinals. Despite not having won any of the previous 5 games, Wisconsin was not fazed by UND's run to repeat as champion and the two teams fought to a 1–1 deadlock in game one. No overtime was used because the two game series was decided on aggregate but the two squads battled in another defensive contest until North Dakota scored twice early in the third. The Badgers rallied from being down by two twice but still found themselves behind with just seconds to play. With Marc Behrend on the bench future Hall of Famer Chris Chelios scored the tying goal with 12 seconds to play and sending the game into overtime. The first two extra periods passed without a goal being scored but just 62 seconds into the third overtime Ted Pearson notched the game-winner. While Wisconsin celebrated the referees checked the length of Pearson's stick and ruled it illegal. As a result the goal was waved off and Pearson was given a 2 minute penalty. With both teams exhausted the game didn't last much longer but, surprisingly, North Dakota allowed the first short-handed goal against all season when Paul Houck scored just 26 seconds into the power-play.

With an NCAA berth all but ensured, Wisconsin headed to Minneapolis to take on the WCHA Champion and swept Minnesota to win their second consecutive WCHA championship, the seventh in team history.

NCAA tournament
Wisconsin was given the top western seed and were slotted to face St. Lawrence who were making their first tournament appearance in over 20 years. The veteran Badgers overwhelmed the Saints, beating the ECAC team soundly in both games to take the series 13–3, the largest margin of victory in any NCAA aggregate series. In the National Semifinal Wisconsin faced a tougher opponent in Providence but were still miles ahead with Behrend being called on to make only 17 saves in the 2–0 shutout.

Wisconsin made their 3rd consecutive championship game, the fifth time in history a team was able to accomplish that feat, but the only time a program did so with two different head coaches. They also faced their third different opponent, this time in the form of Harvard who were in their first championship game after 7 previous trips to the Frozen Four. The badgers jumped out to an early lead, just 7 minutes into the contest, while Behrend held the fort and kept the Crimson scoreless. Patrick Flatley's second goal came with 4 minutes left in the second to build a 2-goal lead and just under seven minutes of game-time later Wisconsin was up by 3. Harvard finally managed to score mid-way through the final frame but each of their two goals were answered by the Badgers and John Johannson empty-net goal sealed the victory for the Badgers.

Awards and honors
In allowing just 5 goals in the 4 games, Marc Behrend was awarded the Tournament MOP for the second time. He became just the second player to be honored twice and the only one to win on both occasions (Lou Angotti is the only other multiple-time winner as of 2019). Wisconsin played 4 players on the All-Tournament Team with Behrend joined by Chris Chelios, Patrick Flatley and Paul Houck. Behrend finished second in the nation with a 2.23 GAA and was tops with a .921 winning percentage but neither mark was good enough to get him named to the All-American West Team. The only Bader All-American was Flatley who was also the only First Team All-WCHA player. though Chelios, Houck and Bruce Driver made the second team. Jeff Sauer became the first person to win a championship in his inaugural season as head coach with a new team and was later joined by Brad Berry in 2016. The Badgers finished the tournament with a +16 goal differential, tying the mark held jointly by 1950 Colorado College and 1953 Michigan.

Standings

Schedule

|-
!colspan=12 style=";" | Exhibition

|-
!colspan=12 style=";" | Regular Season

|- 
!colspan=12 style=";" | 

|- align="center" bgcolor="#e0e0e0"
|colspan=12|Wisconsin Wins Series 8-4

|- align="center" bgcolor="#e0e0e0"
|colspan=12|Wisconsin Wins Series 7-6

|- align="center" bgcolor="#e0e0e0"
|colspan=12|Wisconsin Wins Series 8-3
|-
!colspan=12 style=";" | 

|- align="center" bgcolor="#e0e0e0"
|colspan=12|Wisconsin Wins Series 13-3

Roster and scoring statistics

Goaltending statistics

1983 national championship game

(E1) Harvard vs. (W1) Wisconsin

Players drafted into the NHL

1983 NHL Entry Draft
No Wisconsin players were selected in the NHL draft.

See also
1983 NCAA Division I Men's Ice Hockey Tournament
List of NCAA Division I Men's Ice Hockey Tournament champions

References

Wisconsin Badgers men's ice hockey seasons
Wisconsin
Wisconsin
Wisconsin
Wisconsin
Wisconsin
Wisconsin